Andrew Bennison (November 3, 1886 – January 7, 1942, in Oakland, California) was an American screenwriter and film director whose career was at its peak in the 1930s.

Bennison was nearly entirely a screenwriter between 1923 and 1942 involved in the writing of some 40 American films of that period. He co-directed the film Born Reckless (1930) with acclaimed director John Ford and a young John Wayne as an extra.

He died in Oxnard, California in January 1942.

Selected filmography
 You'll Find Out (1940)
 Chip of the Flying U (1940)
 Oily to Bed, Oily to Rise (1939)
 A Ducking They Did Go (1939)
 Pardon My Scotch (1935)
 This Sporting Age (1932)
 Born Reckless (1930) 
 Let's Go Places (1930)
 Words and Music (1929)
 Strong Boy (1929)
 Sin Sister (1929)
 Woman Wise (1928)
 The Wizard (1927)
 Defying the Law (1924)
 The Greatest Menace (1923)
 Divorce (1923)

References

External links

American male screenwriters
Film directors from California
1886 births
1942 deaths
20th-century American male writers
20th-century American screenwriters